Poovarasan is a 1996 Indian Tamil-language drama film, directed by Gokula Krishnan, starring Karthik and Rachana Banerjee. The film was released on 9 August 1996. This is Rachana Banerjee's debut Tamil film.

Plot 

Ukrapandi, after consulting an astrologer, ordered Govind to kill his baby in order to save his wife's life. Govind gives the baby to Sudalai and orders him to kill the baby. 25 years later, Poovarasan was recruited by Govind to work. Poovarasan and Kaveri fall in love with each other. One day, Poovarasan saves Senadhipathy.

Senadhipathy's son Sinrasu and Ukrapandi's daughter Sundari fall in love. Their parents then agree to the marriage. Before the marriage, Senadhipathy reminds Ukrapandi of his stinging humiliation and orders Ukrapandi to do the same thing. He refuses to do so and the marriage is subsequently cancelled.

While Senadhipathy's son is getting married, Poovarasan stops it and takes him to marry Sundari. The village's chiefs then decide to exonerate the new married couple and teach a lesson to Poovarasan. Poovarasan must attend the "Bhoomi Pooja": the ritual before the construction of any structure.

Meanwhile, an old man, pretending to be Poovarasan's father, is recognised by Govind. Sudalai could not kill the baby and the baby was in fact, Poovarasan. Senadhipathy wants to take revenge on Ukrapandi's family, so he sends his henchmen to kill them. Poovarasan saves them, but he dies by a gunshot.

Cast 

Karthik as Poovarasan
Rachana Banerjee as Kaveri
Vijayakumar as Ukrapandi
Sujatha as Ukrapandi's wife / Govind's sister
Radha Ravi as Senadhipathy
Goundamani as Govind
Senthil as Samuthiram
Chandrasekhar as Sudalai
Thalapathi Dinesh as Houseworker

Soundtrack 
The music was composed by Ilaiyaraaja, with lyrics written by Vaali.

References

External links 

1996 films
Films scored by Ilaiyaraaja
1990s Tamil-language films
Films directed by Gokula Krishnan